Mr. Stink is a 60-minute BBC television film adaptation of the 2009 novel of the same name by David Walliams that was first broadcast on 23 December 2012.

Plot
A 12-year-old girl named Chloe Crumb is on the bus on the way to her school. Her nemesis, Pippa (Jemma Donovan), throws a banana skin on a tramp called Mr. Stink who is sitting on a bench with his dog, Duchess. She goes to see Mr. Stink, who asks for some sausages for the Duchess. The following morning, she takes some sausages to give them to Mr. Stink. Chloe's mother, Caroline (Sheridan Smith), is a candidate to be the local MP. She rips up the story that Chloe wrote, believing that homeless people should be run out of town. Chloe and Mr. Stink enter Starbucks, where everyone runs away due to Mr. Stink's odour. Pippa and her gang enter Starbucks, where Mr. Stink burps on them. Chloe asks Mr. Stink if he would like to stay in her garden shed. Mr. Stink initially refuses, but accepts to stay for the night and then decides to move in permanently.

Chloe discovers her father (Johnny Vegas) was in the Serpents of Doom and finds a burned guitar. Chloe finds her father hiding in the closet while getting her coat, who tells her he lost his job and that Caroline burned his guitar. Chloe promises not to tell her mother about losing his job on the condition he doesn't tell Caroline that someone is living in the shed. While Chloe washes Mr. Stink's coat, her sister, Annabelle (Isabella Blake-Thomas), catches Chloe doing it and reports it to their mother, who sends Chloe's father to check out the shed; he says no one is there, deciding he won't tell since Chloe didn't tell. During Caroline's interview, Mr. Stink bursts into anger over the washed coat, becoming an Internet sensation and leaves. Caroline is invited on Politics Tonight, though Mr. Stink must appear too, forcing them to search for Mr. Stink. Chloe finds Mr. Stink in Starbucks and reconciles with him.

On Politics Tonight, Caroline lies, saying that she invited Mr. Stink, but Mr. Stink tells the truth, that it was Chloe who invited him into their home. When a candidate from a rival party says he would invite Mr. Stink into his garden shed, Caroline bursts out and is subsequently disgraced and forced by the Prime Minister (book author David Walliams) to withdraw her campaign. While Chloe's father admits losing his job to Caroline. Mr. Stink and Chloe meet the Prime Minister, who is mean to Mr. Stink. Chloe tells him "to stick his job offer up his fat bum."

Mr. Stink then tells Chloe his story, telling her that he was once a rich man named Lord Darlington. He had a wife called Agatha. She became pregnant, but when she was eight months pregnant, Mr. Stink went to a party, leaving his wife at home and when he got back, the house was ablaze. Agatha died and Mr. Stink, who couldn't bear living in the house any more, walked and never came back. Mr. Stink tells Chloe she can't come with him, though Chloe insists and Mr. Stink decides to talk with her mother. As Chloe packs her bags, her mother arrives crying, pleading with Chloe not to leave. Chloe eventually reconciles with Caroline, who later gives Chloe back the ripped up story and gives Chloe's father a new guitar. While Chloe's father plays the guitar, Mr. Stink leaves. Chloe runs after him, where he tells her he has decided to wander on. He gives Chloe a present and says goodbye to Chloe. Chloe starts writing her journey with Mr. Stink, which starts by "Mr. Stink stank. He also stunk. He was the stinkiest stinker who ever lived."

Cast
Hugh Bonneville as Mr. Stink
Pudsey (dog) as Duchess
Nell Tiger Free as Chloe
Johnny Vegas as Chloe's dad
Sheridan Smith as Chloe's mum
Isabella Blake-Thomas as Anabelle
Harish Patel as Raj
David Walliams as Prime Minister 
Jemma Donovan as Pippa

Broadcast
It aired on 23 December 2012 on BBC One after it was originally scheduled for Boxing Day. The film was the most watched in its 6:30-7:30pm timeslot with 6.34 million viewers tuning in. It was also broadcast and was the BBC's first ever narrative program to be filmed in 3D.

References

External links
 
 

2012 television films
2012 films
BBC Television shows
Films scored by David Arnold
Films based on British novels